Sarah Lohman is an American historian, specializing in the history of food.  She is the author of Eight Flavors: The Untold Story of American Cuisine.

Biography
As a teenager, growing up in Hinckley, Ohio, Lohman worked, in costume, as a historic re-enactor.  Her duties there included showing visitors how Americans used to prepare food. In 2005, she earned a Bachelor of Fine Arts from the Cleveland Institute of Art.

She traveled to New York City in 2006.  She worked for Grub Street, upon her arrival, and worked at the Tenement Museum from 2009.

In 2016, she told The New York Times that she "searches old cookbooks and other records to recreate forgotten recipes as a way of studying history".  She then prepares food, according to those recipes.  She called eating those foods "an elaborate form of performance art".

Her book, published in 2016, has eight chapters, which each trace a signature taste crucial to the development of modern American cooking: black pepper, vanilla, curry powder, chili powder, soy sauce, garlic, MSG, and Sriracha.  Several reviewers praised Lohman's deep research, and told readers her writing was informed by wide travel to conduct that research.

Lohman was one of the food historians used as an expert in a PBS documentary series entitled "The Poison Squad", first broadcast in 2020.

Lohman is working on a second book, documenting cookery at risk of disappearing, entitled Endangered Eating: Exploring America’s Vanishing Cuisine, scheduled for publication in 2021.

References

American historians
Year of birth missing (living people)
Living people
American women historians
Food historians
Cleveland Institute of Art alumni
21st-century American women